The ASA Gold Medal is an annual award presented by the Acoustical Society of America (ASA) to individuals in recognition of outstanding contributions to acoustics.  The Gold Medal was first presented in 1954 and is the highest award of the ASA.  Past recipients, which include the Nobel Laureate Georg von Békésy, are listed below.

Recipients

Notes

See also

 List of physics awards

References 

Awards of the Acoustical Society of America